Moncreiffe may refer to:

People
Georgina Ward, Countess of Dudley (née Moncreiffe; 1846–1929), Scottish noblewoman
Sir Iain Moncreiffe of that Ilk (1919–1985), Baronet, British officer in arms, clan chief
Peregrine Moncreiffe of that Ilk, clan chief
Sir Thomas Moncreiffe, 7th Baronet (1822–1879), Scottish first-class cricketer and British Army officer

Places
Moncreiffe Hill, ridge south of Perth, Scotland
Moncreiffe Island, dividing the River Tay below Perth, Scotland

Other uses
Clan Moncreiffe, Highland Scottish clan
Baron Moncreiff, title in the peerage of the United Kingdom

See also
Moncrieff (disambiguation)
Moncrief (surname)

Surnames of Scottish origin